"¿Quién será?" is a bolero-mambo song written by Mexican composers Luis Demetrio and Pablo Beltrán Ruiz. Beltrán recorded the song for the first time with his orchestra in 1953. Pedro Infante, for whom the song was written, recorded it in 1954.

Norman Gimbel took the song, removed the somewhat melancholy Spanish lyrics about a man wondering if he shall ever love again, and wrote brand-new English lyrics about a man praising his dancing partner's ability to affect his heart with how she "sways" when they dance. This new song, titled "Sway", has become a standard in the pop repertoire. The first version to achieve considerable success in the United States was recorded by singer Dean Martin with the Dick Stabile orchestra in 1954.

Pablo Beltrán version

The first rendition of Luis Demetrio's "¿Quién será?" was recorded by Pablo Beltrán Ruiz with his orchestra as an instrumental cha-cha-chá in 1953. This version was later included on the LP South of the Border / Al sur de la frontera - Cha-cha-cha. According to Demetrio, Beltrán only contributed the first few chords of the song. The rest of the composition and the original lyrics (in Spanish) were all written by Demetrio. However, because Demetrio sold his rights to Beltrán, the song has often been misattributed to the latter.

Beltrán re-recorded the song on numerous occasions including an upbeat cumbia version for the album Mister Cumbia (1966), a ska version for the album Caliente, caliente... a go-go (1966) and a boogaloo version for the album Rosita bonita (1968), all released by RCA Victor. The cumbia version was featured in the 1967 Cantinflas film Su Excelencia.

Pedro Infante cover version
Demetrio had written the song specifically for Mexican singer Pedro Infante, who performed it in the film School for Tramps in 1954 and later recorded it for Peerless Records. It became one of Infante's signature songs and a hit across Latin America. Shortly after, Germán Valdés, better known as Tin Tan, performed a parody version of Infante's rendition in the film The Viscount of Monte Cristo.

Dean Martin cover version

In 1954, the English lyrics were written by Norman Gimbel and recorded by Dean Martin backed by Dick Stabile's orchestra. This recording reached number 15 on the Billboard magazine best-seller chart and number six on the UK chart. The single was released with the B-side "Money Burns a Hole in My Pocket" (Jule Styne, Bob Hilliard) in the US, while the British version was backed by "Pretty as a Picture" (Johnny Anz). The song was well received by critics, being described as a "happy reading of a listenable ditty in the Latin-American manner" by a contemporary reviewer. A version of his rendition is used in the trailer for the movie Operation Fortune: Ruse de Guerre (2022).

Charts

Shaft cover version

British electronica band Shaft recorded "Sway", retitled as "(Mucho Mambo) Sway", and released it on 23 August 1999 as their debut single. This version is based on Rosemary Clooney's 1960 version, but following a dispute with the copyright holders of her recording, Shaft recorded new vocals with session singer Donna Canale. The single peaked at No. 2 on the UK Singles Chart, topped the New Zealand Singles Chart, and reached the top 10 in Denmark, Ireland, Norway, Sweden, and on the Canadian Singles Chart. The single was later included on Shaft's 2001, album Pick Up on This.

Background
"(Mucho Mambo) Sway" first gained attention after being featured in a television advertisement for London radio station Kiss FM. This recording was an updated version of Rosemary Clooney's 1960 version, featuring her vocals. The cover was set to be released, and many copies had already been mailed out, but the copyright holders of Clooney's version enacted a moratorium on the single to prohibit commercial usage. As a result, it was pulled from radio and television, and production of the single ceased, causing the original recording of "(Mucho Mambo) Sway" to become exponentially more valuable. Following the ban, Shaft recruited Donna Canale to sing the vocals on a new version of the song. This time, they were allowed to market the single, and two days after production was finished, it went sent to record shops.

Charts

Weekly charts

Year-end charts

Certifications

Michael Bublé cover version

"Sway" was covered by Canadian singer Michael Bublé for his debut studio album, Michael Bublé, released in 2003. Sway was chosen for release as the album's third single, and was released in Australia on 22 June 2004.

Sway was only released as an individual single in Australia. In many other countries, the release of the track was held back until 26 July, and packaged as a double A-side with the album's fourth single, Spider-Man Theme. However, due to its popularity with Australian radio stations, the track was given a separate release in the region, with Spider-Man Theme being released three months later in September 2004, as a separate release. Bublé's version of the song has appeared in such television shows and films as Las Vegas, CSI: NY, Malcolm in the Middle, The Wedding Date, Da Kath and Kim Code and No Reservations. The music video for the track was directed by Peter Kasden, who also filmed a music video for the single's B-side, Moondance, which was released exclusively to Australian music channels to promote the release of the single. The video features scenes of Bublé performing the song in the studio, intercut with scenes of Bublé driving a car through the Australian outback. The separate release, two music videos and strong radio airplay meant that Sway reached a peak of No. 15 on the ARIA Singles Chart, making it Bublé's highest charting single to that date.

Track listing
Australian CD single
 "Sway" (Junkie XL Mix) – 3:46
 "Sway" (acoustic version) – 3:08
 "Moondance" (live version) – 3:45

Charts

The Pussycat Dolls cover version

American girl group The Pussycat Dolls recorded "Sway" and released as the only single for the Shall We Dance? soundtrack. It is also the group's debut single overall. It was later included as a bonus track on their debut studio album, PCD (2005).

Critical reception
While reviewing the Shall We Dance? soundtrack, Heather Phares cited "Sway" as one of the highlights of the album. Ashley Spencer from the Orlando Sentinel described the rendition as having a "mesmerizing rhythm". While reviewing the DVD of Shall We Dance? Renata Joy of Dvdizzy.com pointed the song out as "a catchy tune". Rachel Sexton of MovieFreak.com called the cover "great" and noted it as "a classic updated".

Promotion
The music video for "Sway" was directed by Steve Antin, the brother of The Pussycat Dolls creator, Robin Antin. The video features The Pussycat Dolls dancing against a backdrop of scenes from the movie. The music video was included as bonus clip in the DVD release of Shall We Dance. At that point, the Pussycat Dolls were still recording their album PCD, and the group featured members of the original Pussycat Dolls burlesque troupe who remained after the re-casting process, such as Robin Antin, Cyia Batten, Kasey Campbell and Kaya Jones. Reviewers for Comingsoon.net, Edward Douglas and Scott Chitwood described the video as "sexy" and "stylish". They also wrote that "it perfectly fits the mood of the film." Slant Magazine's writer Ed Gonzales wondered if the editors of Maxim financed the video. Rachel Sexton of MovieFreak.com suggested buyers to skip the video calling it "cheesy". Renata Joy of Dvdizzy.com noted that "the song is much more enjoyable when not watching the accompanying video." "Sway" was performed on Dancing with the Stars along with "Don't Cha" during the results show on 27 January 2006.

Track listing
Digital download
 "Sway" (Alternate version) – 3:12

Personnel
Credits adapted from the liner notes of Shall We Dance - Soundtrack from the Motion Picture.

 Nicole Scherzinger – lead vocals, background vocals
 Carmit Bachar – additional vocals
 Melody Thornton – additional vocals
 Kaya Jones – additional vocals
 Ron Fair – producer, marimba
 Bill Reichenbach – trombone
 Tony Terran – trumpet

Charts

Other versions
"¿Quién será?" and "Sway" have been recorded dozens of times by many artists over the decades, many of which have been included in feature films and TV episodes. This is merely a select list of popular recordings, not a comprehensive listing.

 1960 – Bobby Rydell recorded the first of two hit versions of the song, reaching number 14 on the Billboard charts and number 12 in Canada. A disco re-recording in 1976 reached number 27 on the adult contemporary charts.
 1960 – Connie Francis – Connie Francis Sings Spanish and Latin American Favorites, MGM Records
 1960 – Rosemary Clooney and Dámaso Pérez Prado – A Touch of Tabasco, RCA Victor
 1963 – Julie London – Latin in a Satin Mood, Liberty Record
1965 – Cliff Richard – Cliff Richard, Columbia Records
 1997 – Brent Spiner on the soundtrack of the movie Out to Sea
 1998 – The film Dark City, featured the version by Anita Kelsey, lip-synched by Jennifer Connelly's character as a lounge act (Jennifer Connelly herself sang it in the Director's Cut)
 2005 – The documentary film Romántico, directed by Mark Becker, features a version of the song played by Arturo Arias and Carmelo Muñiz
 2005 – The film The Wedding Date, directed by Clare Kilner, features the version by Michael Bublé
 2008 – The film Paris, directed by Cédric Klapisch, features the version by Pérez Prado and Rosemary Clooney
 2008 – The film Revolutionary Road, directed by Sam Mendes
 2010 – The film Repo Men, directed by Miguel Sapochnik, features the version by Pérez Prado and Rosemary Clooney

References

External links
 Original lyrics (in Spanish) to the song Sway (¿Quien será?)

Songs with lyrics by Norman Gimbel
1953 songs
1999 debut singles
2004 debut singles
Pop ballads
Dean Martin songs
Michael Bublé songs
Rosemary Clooney songs
The Pussycat Dolls songs
Jennifer Lopez songs
Spanish-language songs
Trio Los Panchos songs
Number-one singles in New Zealand
RCA Victor singles
Capitol Records singles
Universal Records singles
143 Records singles
Reprise Records singles
A&M Records singles
Interscope Records singles